Year 283 (CCLXXXIII) was a common year starting on Monday (link will display the full calendar) of the Julian calendar. At the time, it was known as the Year of the Consulship of Carus and Carinus (or, less frequently, year 1036 Ab urbe condita). The denomination 283 for this year has been used since the early medieval period, when the Anno Domini calendar era became the prevalent method in Europe for naming years.

Events 
 By place 
 Roman Empire 
 Spring: Emperor Carus makes his son Carinus the Augustus in the west.
 Exploiting the Persian civil war, Carus leaves Carinus in charge of much of the Roman Empire and, accompanied by his younger son Numerian, invades the Sassanid Empire. They sack Seleucia and Ctesiphon, the capital of the Persian kingdom, and they press on beyond the Tigris. For his victories, Carus receives the title of Persicus Maximus.
 The officer Diocles, the future Emperor Diocletian, distinguishes himself in the war against the Persians.
 Carinus campaigns with success in Britain and on the Rhine frontier.
 Summer: Carus dies in mysterious circumstances during the war against the Persians. Various sources claim he died of illness, was struck by lightning or was killed in combat.
 Carinus and Numerian succeed their father Carus. Numerian, who had accompanied his father into the Persian Empire, leads the army back to Roman territory.
 The corrector Aurelius Julianus usurps power in Pannonia but is defeated by Carinus.

 Persian Empire 
 The King of Kings Bahram II fights a civil war against his brother Hormizd, the king of Sakastan.

 By topic 
 Religion 
 December 17 – Pope Cais succeeds Eutychian as the 28th pope of Rome.

Births 
 Eusebius of Vercelli, Christian bishop and saint (d. 371)
 Ge Hong, Chinese scholar and philosopher (d. 343)

Deaths 
 December 7 – Etychian, bishop of Rome
 Marcus Aurelius Carus, Roman emperor (b. 224)
 Shan Tao, Chinese scholar and politician (b. 205)
 Sima You (or Dayou), Chinese prince (b. 248)
 Sima Zhou (or Zijiang), Chinese prince (b. 227)

References